The Statute of Westminster of 1285, also known as the Statute of Westminster II or the Statute of Westminster the Second, like the Statute of Westminster 1275, is a code in itself, and contains the famous clause De donis conditionalibus, one of the fundamental institutes of the medieval land law of England.

William Stubbs says of it:

Most of the statute was repealed in the Republic of Ireland in 1983 and the rest in 2009.

Chapters
The Statute of Westminster II is composed of 50 chapters. The de donis conditionalibus clause is chapter 1, and is still in force. Chapter 46 became known as the Commons Act 1285 and was repealed in England in 2006, and in Wales in 2007.

See also
 Casu consimili
 Statute of Winchester of 1285 (13 Edw. I, St. 2)

References

External links
 List of repeals in the Republic of Ireland from the Irish Statute Book.
 

1285 in England
1280s in law
Acts of the Parliament of England
Acts of the Parliament of England still in force
History of the City of Westminster
13th century in England
Medieval English law